Dinan Yahdian Javier (born 6 April 1995) is an Indonesian former footballer who played as a forward.

International career
Javier was born in Bantul. In 2013, he was called up to the under-19 team for the 2013 AFF U-19 Youth Championship. In this championship, the team won the AFF Cup for the first time. Two weeks later, the team qualified for the 2014 AFC U-19 Championship for the 16th time, losing all three of its games in the opening group stage.

Honours

International
Indonesia U19
 AFF U-19 Youth Championship: 2013

References

External links

1995 births
Living people
Indonesian footballers
Mitra Kukar players
Bhayangkara F.C. players
Borneo F.C. players
Liga 1 (Indonesia) players
People from Bantul Regency
Indonesia youth international footballers
Association football forwards